K(lysine) acetyltransferase 8 (KAT8) is an enzyme that in humans is encoded by the KAT8 gene.

Function 

The MYST family of histone acetyltransferases, which includes KAT8, was named for the founding members MOZ (MYST3; MIM 601408), yeast YBF2 and SAS2, and TIP60 (HTATIP; MIM 601409). All members of this family contain a MYST region of about 240 amino acids with a canonical acetyl-CoA-binding site and a C2HC-type zinc finger motif. Most MYST proteins also have a chromodomain involved in protein-protein interactions and targeting transcriptional regulators to chromatin.

Interactions 

KAT8 has been shown to interact with MORF4L1.

References

Further reading

External links